James Shaw Grant FRSE CBE (22 May 1910 – 28 July 1999) was a writer and journalist from the Isle of Lewis. He was strongly associated with the Highlands and Islands Development Board.

Life

He was born in Stornoway and educated at the Nicholson Institute in Stornoway. He then attended Glasgow University gaining an MA 1931.

He became editor of the Stornoway Gazette in 1932 following on from his father and held this post until 1963.

In 1956 he broadcast A Gaelic capital on BBC Scotland, an audio tour of Stornoway.  He wrote a number of books about crofting communities, such as the comic novel The Enchanted Island.

From 1972 to 1984 he was Chairman of the Harris Tweed Association. He was also Chairman of the Crofters Commission 1963 to 1978.

In 1979 Aberdeen University awarded him an honorary doctorate (LLD).

In 1982 he was elected a Fellow of the Royal Society of Edinburgh. His proposers were Fraser Noble, Lord Cameron, Anthony Elliot Ritchie, Neill Campbell, Thomas L Johnston and Sir Kenneth Alexander.

Family

In 1951 he married Catherine Mary Stewart (d.1989).

Books

Highland Villages, 1977, Hale, 
The Hub of my Universe, 1982, James Thin, 
The Gaelic Vikings, 1984, James Thin, 
Discovering Lewis & Harris, 1987, John Donald, 
The Enchanted Island, 1989, J. S. Grant, 
A Shilling for Your Scowl: The History of a Scottish Legal Mafia, 1991, Acair, 
Morrison of the Bounty: A Scotsman - Famous But Unknown, 1997, Acair,

References

External links
Biography  from the Royal Society of Edinburgh

1910 births
1999 deaths
Scottish journalists
People from the Isle of Lewis
Fellows of the Royal Society of Edinburgh
Scottish newspaper editors
Scottish broadcasters
20th-century Scottish novelists
Scottish male novelists
20th-century British male writers